Rear-Admiral Sir Patrick Macnamara KBE, CB (11 January 1886 – 4 April 1957) was a Royal Navy officer.

Naval career
Educated at Bradfield College and the training ship HMS Britannia, Macnamara joined the Royal Navy in January 1901. He served as gunnery officer in the battlecruiser HMS Tiger during the First World War. Promoted to captain on 30 June 1925, he was given command of the cruiser HMS Effingham in October 1927 and then the battleship HMS Nelson in September 1933 before retiring in 1936. He was recalled in 1939,  promoted to rear-admiral and served as Flag Officer, Scapa Flow throughout the Second World War.

He was advanced to Knight Commander of the Order of the British Empire on 13 June 1946.

References

Royal Navy admirals
1886 births
1957 deaths
Knights Commander of the Order of the British Empire
Companions of the Order of the Bath